was a Japanese voice actor who was best known as the voice of Anakaris, Bishamon, Sasquatch and Victor von Gerdenheim (Darkstalkers).

Filmography

Television animation
1995
Virtua Fighter – Clive
1996
Case Closed – Detective
1997
Berserk - Snake Baron (ep. 1)
2003
Wolf's Rain - Retrieval Squad Commander

Video games
Vampire: The Night Warriors (1994) - Anakaris, Bishamon, Sasquatch and Victor von Gerdenheim
Vampire Hunter: Darkstalkers' Revenge (1995) - (Anakaris, Bishamon, Sasquatch, Victor von Gerdenheim)
Street Fighter III (1997) - Oro
Street Fighter III: 2nd Impact - Oro
Vampire Savior: The Lord of Vampire (1998) - (Anakaris, Bishamon, Sasquatch, Victor von Gerdenheim) 
Strider 2 - Grandmaster Meio
Marvel vs. Capcom 2: New Age of Heroes - Anakaris, Amingo, The Abyss
Shinobi - (Hiruko Ubusuna (Old))
Capcom Fighting Jam - Anakaris

Dubbing Roles

Live-action
The Amityville Horror (1982 NTV edition) (Father Bolen (Don Stroud))
Beverly Hills Cop III (Ellis DeWald (Timothy Carhart))
Death Wish (1980 TV Asahi edition) (Jack Toby (Steven Keats))
The Goonies (1988 TBS edition) (Jake Fratelli (Robert Davi))

Animation
Iron Man (Dum Dum Dugan)

References

External links 

1941 births
2011 deaths
Japanese male video game actors
Japanese male voice actors